The Commander-in-Chief Fleet (CINCFLEET) was the admiral responsible for the operations of the ships, submarines and aircraft of the British Royal Navy from 1971 until April 2012. The post was subordinate to the First Sea Lord, the professional head of the Naval Service. In its last years, as the Navy shrank, more administrative responsibilities were added.

In April 2012, the post was abolished, its rank downgraded from admiral to three-star vice admiral, and re-designated Fleet Commander and Deputy Chief of Naval Staff.

History
Prior to 1964 responsibility for control and direction of British naval affairs lay with the Admiralty, naval command lay with the Admiralty Naval Staff. Following the merger of the Admiralty in 1964 into the new Ministry of Defence it became known as the Navy Department.

In November 1971, force reductions resulted in the Western Fleet being amalgamated with the Far East Fleet. It was to be commanded by a four star admiral who held the title Commander-in-Chief Fleet, with his headquarters at the Northwood Headquarters, Middlesex, England. Previous to November 1971, on 1 May 1971 CINCWF had already assumed responsibility for the administration of ships in the Far East Fleet. From 1971-72 CINCFLEET directed Flag Officer, Carriers and Amphibious Ships; Flag Officer First Flotilla; Flag Officer, Second Flotilla; Flag Officer Submarines; the Hydrographer of the Navy, Rear Admiral Geoffrey Hall (all survey vessels); Flag Officer Sea Training (all ships in workup at Portland); and Captain, Mine Countermeasures. Operational control was delegated to FOSNI, Flag Officer Plymouth, Flag Officer Gibraltar, Flag Officer Malta, Senior Naval Officer West Indies, Commander, ANZUK Naval Forces, and Commodore-in-Charge, Hong Kong.

The Flag Officer Gibraltar, and Gibraltar Naval Base Commander, a Rear Admiral, double-hatted as NATO's Commander Gibraltar Mediterranean (COMGIBMED). In the late 1980s two small patrol craft, were reported as being attached to FO Gibraltar.

The post of CINCFLEET also was assigned the NATO appointments of Commander-in-Chief, Eastern Atlantic Area (CINCEASTLANT) and Commander-in-Chief Channel (CINCHAN). On 1 July 1994, the Channel Command was disestablished: however most of its subordinate commands remained in existence although reshuffled: most of the headquarters were absorbed within Allied Command Europe particularly as part of the new Allied Forces Northwestern Europe.

In 1992 Fleet Headquarters moved to Portsmouth. In 2005, the Second Sea Lord, reduced in rank from full Admiral to Vice-Admiral, came under CINCFLEET's command, a situation that lasted until the Levene reforms of 2012.

Responsibilities

Full command of the Fleet and responsibility for the Fleet element of military operational capability including the Royal Marines and the Royal Fleet Auxiliary, was delegated to Commander-in-Chief Fleet, as is described in official descriptions circa 2010. In 1971 after the amalgamation of the Western and Far East Fleets the headquarters was established at Northwood, in the London Borough of Hillingdon (HMS Warrior). Both the CINCFLEET and CINCEASTLANT staffs were co-located there. 

By the early 21st century the headquarters was split. In 2002 a new Command Headquarters, the Navy Command Headquarters Building at HMS Excellent in Portsmouth was completed. Thereafter the headquarters was split between the Command HQ and CINCFLEET's Operational Headquarters at Northwood, co-located with the Permanent Joint Headquarters.

By the 2010s, CINCFLEET was supported by:
Second Sea Lord and Commander-in-Chief Naval Home Command, based in HMS Excellent, who was the Principal Personnel Officer for the Royal Navy. The CINCNAVHOME title lapsed in 2012.
Deputy CINCFLEET, based in HMS Excellent, who directed the work of the Fleet Headquarters
Commander Operations, based at Northwood, responsible for fleet operations
Commander United Kingdom Amphibious Forces, who was Commandant General Royal Marines
Commander United Kingdom Maritime Forces (previously known as Commander UK Task Group), who oversaw the commander of the UK Task Group (COMUKTG), subsequently renamed as the commander Amphibious Task Group (COMATG) and the commander UK Carrier Strike Group (COMUKCSG).

Collectively, COMUKMARFOR, COMUKAMPHIBFOR, Commander UK Task Group (COMUKTG), and the 3 Commando Brigade Headquarters comprised the "Fleet Battle Staff".

Commanders-in-Chief Fleet
The Commanders-in-Chief were:

Deputy Commander-in-Chief, and Chief of Staff 
Deputy Commanders have included:
 Vice Admiral Sir Roy Newman, Feb 1990–June 1992
 Vice Admiral Sir Geoffrey Biggs, June 1992–June 1994
 Vice Admiral Sir Jonathan Tod, June 1994–June 1997
 Vice Admiral Sir Jeremy Blackham, June 1997–Jan 1999
 Vice Admiral Sir Fabian Malbon, Jan 1999–May 2001
 Vice Admiral Sir Jonathon Band, May 2001–July 2002
 Vice Admiral Sir Mark Stanhope, July 2002–June 2004
 Vice Admiral Sir Timothy McClement, June 2004–Oct 2006
 Vice Admiral Paul Boissier, Oct 2006–July 2009
 Vice Admiral Sir Richard Ibbotson, July 2009–Jan 2011
 Vice Admiral Sir George Zambellas, Jan 2011–Dec 2011
 Vice Admiral Philip Jones Dec 2011–April 2012

Chiefs of Staff 
The Commander-in-Chief, Fleet's principal staff officer was the Chief of Staff, Fleet, responsible for coordinating the supporting staff of Fleet Headquarters from November 1971 to 2012.

Subordinate commands 
At various times included:

Structure charts

Flag Officer First Flotilla, 1989 

The Flag Officer First Flotilla (FOF1) was a rear admiral based HMNB Portsmouth who commanded the navy's First Flotilla.

 First Flotilla, HMNB Portsmouth 
 1st Frigate Squadron, HMNB Devonport with
 2nd Frigate Squadron, HMNB Devonport with
 5th Destroyer Squadron, HMNB Portsmouth with
 6th Frigate Squadron, HMNB Devonport with
 Dartmouth Training Squadron (JFS 1989, p. 651)
 Type 82 destroyer: , s (Batch 3B): ,

Flag Officer, Second Flotilla, 1989

The Flag Officer, Second Flotilla was a rear admiral based HMNB Devonport who commanded the navy's Second Flotilla.

 Second Flotilla, with ships based HMNB Devonport:
 3rd Destroyer Squadron, RN Dockyard Rosyth with
 4th Frigate Squadron, HMNB Devonport with 
 7th Frigate Squadron, HMNB Devonport with 
 s (Batch 2): ,  (Batch 1, decommissioned April 1989), 
 8th Frigate Squadron, HMNB Devonport with 

Flag Officer, Third Flotilla, 1989

The Flag Officer, Third Flotilla was a rear admiral based at HMNB Portsmouth who doubled as NATO Commander Anti-Submarine Warfare Striking Force. In 1989 Vice Admiral Alan Grose held this appointment.

 Third Flotilla, HMNB Portsmouth
 ,  (refit at HMNB Devonport), RFA Argus, RFA Engadine (decommissioned March 1989), HMS Endurance (ice patrol vessel)

Flag Officer Scotland and Northern Ireland, 1989

The Flag Officer Scotland and Northern Ireland (FOSNI) was a vice admiral based at RAF Pitreavie Castle, who commanded the navy's units in Scotland and Northern Ireland and double-hatted as Naval Base Commander at Rosyth, NATO Commander Northern Sub-Area (NORLANT) and Commander Nore Sub-Area Channel (NORECHAN). The main unit under his command was the Mine Countermeasures Flotilla based at Royal Naval Dockyard Rosyth on the Firth of Forth, which was commanded by a commodore. Additionally the Second Flotilla's 3rd Destroyer Squadron was based at RN Dockyard Rosyth. In war FOSNI would have been one of two naval operational commands, with the other being Flag Officer Plymouth.

 Flag Officer Scotland and Northern Ireland, RAF Pitreavie Castle, Rosyth
Mine Countermeasures Flotilla, Royal Naval Dockyard Rosyth
 1st Mine Countermeasures Squadron, RN Dockyard Rosyth with
 2nd Mine Countermeasures Squadron, RN Dockyard Rosyth with
 3rd Mine Countermeasures Squadron, HMNB Portsmouth with
 s: HMS Hubberston, HMS Sheraton, HMS Brinton, HMS Maxton (decommissioned August 1989)
 :  (commissioned 9 June 1989)
 4th Mine Countermeasures Squadron, RN Dockyard Rosyth with
 10th Mine Countermeasures Squadron, manned by the Royal Naval Reserve and each of the squadron's ships assigned to a reserve divisions:
 s: HMS Waveney, HMS Carron, HMS Dovey, HMS Helford, HMS Humber, HMS Blackwater, HMS Itchen, HMS Helmsdale, HMS Orwell, HMS Ribble, HMS Spey, HMS Arun
 Fishery Protection Squadron, RN Dockyard Rosyth with:
 s: , HMS Soberton, HMS Upton
 Castle-class patrol vessel: 
 Island-class patrol vessels: HMS Anglesey, HMS Alderney, HMS Jersey, HMS Guernsey, HMS Shetland, HMS Orkney, HMS Lindisfarne
 Northern Ireland Patrol Squadron, Belfast Harbour with
 s: HMS Cuxton, HMS Kedleston, HMS Nurton,  (built with glass-reinforced plastic)
 Bird-class patrol vessels: HMS Cygnet, HMS Redpole

Flag Officer Plymouth, 1989

The Flag Officer Plymouth was a vice admiral based at Admiralty House, who commanded the navy's units in England and Wales and double-hatted as Naval Base Commander Devonport, NATO Commander Central Sub-Area (CENTLANT) and Commander Plymouth Sub-Area Channel (PLYMCHAN). In war Flag Officer Plymouth would have been one of two naval operational commands, with the other being Flag Officer Scotland and Northern Ireland.

Flag Officer Submarines, 1989
The Flag Officer Submarines was a rear admiral based at Northwood Headquarters, who commanded the Royal Navy Submarine Service and double-hatted as NATO Commander Submarine Force Eastern Atlantic (COMSUBEASTLANT).

 Flag Officer Submarines (FOSM), Northwood Headquarters, Eastbury
 1st Submarine Squadron, HMS Dolphin with 
 s:  (only harbour service),  (sold to Canada in 1989),  (sold to Canada in 1989), 
 2nd Submarine Squadron, HMNB Devonport with
 s: ,  (refit at HMNB Devonport), 
 3rd Submarine Squadron, HMNB Clyde with
 s:  (refit at RN Dockyard Rosyth), 
 s: ,  (refit at HMNB Devonport)
 10th Submarine Squadron, HMNB Clyde with

Flag Officer Naval Air Command, 1989

The Flag Officer Naval Air Command was a rear admiral based at RNAS Yeovilton, who commanded the Fleet Air Arm.

 Flag Officer Naval Air Command (FONAC), RNAS Yeovilton
 RNAS Prestwick:
 819 Naval Air Squadron (Anti-submarine, Sea King HAS.5)
 824 Naval Air Squadron (Anti-submarine, Sea King HAS.6) (disbanded August 1989)
 RNAS Yeovilton:
 707 Naval Air Squadron (Air assault, Sea King HC.4)
 800 Naval Air Squadron (Sea Harrier FRS.1, being upgraded to F(A).2)
 801 Naval Air Squadron (Sea Harrier FRS.1, being upgraded to F(A).2)
 845 Naval Air Squadron (Air assault, Sea King HC.4)
 846 Naval Air Squadron (Air assault, Sea King HC.4)
 899 Naval Air Squadron (Training, Sea Harrier FRS.1, Sea Harrier T.4A/T.4N, Hunter T.8M)
 Fleet Requirements and Aircraft Direction Unit (Canberra TT.18, Hunter GA.11/T.8, Dassault Falcon 20)
 RNAS Culdrose:
 705 Naval Air Squadron (Basic helicopter training, Gazelle HT.2/HT.3)
 706 Naval Air Squadron (Sea King training, various Sea King)
 Sea King Training Unit (RAF unit attached to 706 Naval Air Squadron, 2x Sea King HAR.3)
 750 Naval Air Squadron (Observer training, Jetstream T.2)
 771 Naval Air Squadron (Search & Rescue, Sea King HAR.5)
 814 Naval Air Squadron (Anti-submarine, Sea King HAS.5)
 820 Naval Air Squadron (Anti-submarine, Sea King HAS.6)
 826 Naval Air Squadron (Anti-submarine, Sea King HAS.6)
 849 Naval Air Squadron (Airborne early warning and control, 10x Sea King AEW.2A)
 RNAS Portland:
 702 Naval Air Squadron (Training, Lynx HAS.3S)
 772 Naval Air Squadron (Air assault, Sea King HC.4)
 810 Naval Air Squadron (Anti-submarine, Sea King HAS.5, began conversion to HAS.6 in October 1989)
 815 Naval Air Squadron (Frigate & destroyer helicopters, Lynx HAS.3S, most deployed on frigates and destroyers at sea)
 829 Naval Air Squadron (Frigate & destroyer helicopters, Lynx HAS.3S, most deployed on frigates and destroyers at sea)
 Lynx HMA.8 trials unit (formed in September 1989)
 Roborough:
 Flying Grading Flight (Chipmunk T.10)

Commandant General Royal Marines, 1989

The Commandant General Royal Marines, in 1989 Lieutenant General Sir Martin Garrod based at Whitehall, was the service head of the Royal Marines. In 1991 their structure was described as "very top heavy. They have nearly 8,000 men to put 2,400 in the field...they have three 'tied' generals, the Commandant General, a major general as his chief of staff, and a major general commando forces."

 Commandant General Royal Marines, London
Major-General, Commando Forces
3 Commando Brigade, Plymouth
40 Commando, Taunton
 42 Commando, Bickleigh
 45 Commando, Arbroath
4 Assault Squadron, Plymouth (4x LCU Mk.9, 4x LCVP Mk.4, 2x Centurion BARV), served aboard 
539 Assault Squadron, Plymouth (4x LCU Mk.9, 4x LCVP Mk.4, 2x Centurion BARV), served aboard 
3 Commando Brigade Air Squadron, RNAS Yeovilton (12x Gazelle AH.1, 6x Lynx AH.1)
2 Raiding Squadron, Royal Marines (Reserve), Plymouth
 Comacchio Group, HMNB Clyde, guarded HMNB Clyde and the UK's naval nuclear weapons stored at RNAD Coulport
 Royal Marines Police, Plymouth
 Commando Training Centre Royal Marines, Lympstone
 Royal Marines Reserve (RMR), Plymouth
 RMR Bristol, Bristol
 RMR London, Wandsworth
 RMR Merseyside, Liverpool
 RMR Scotland, Edinburgh
 RMR Tyne, Newcastle

Note: "(V)" denotes British Army reserve units.

See also
 Commander-in-Chief, Land Forces
 Commander-in-Chief of Air Command

References

Further reading 
  Cooke-Priest was Flag Officer, Naval Aviation.
 Commander R. W. Moland RN (1972) One Fleet: A Structural Outline, The RUSI Journal, 117:666, 17-20, DOI: 10.1080/03071847209429770 

F
Fleets of the Royal Navy
1971 establishments in the United Kingdom
2012 disestablishments in the United Kingdom